Lyngdalsfjorden is a fjord in Agder county, Norway. The  fjord begins at the village of Alleen in Lyngdal municipality and it flows southwest into Farsund municipality before emptying into the North Sea just south of the town of Farsund. The Åptafjorden joins the Lyngdalsfjorden from the northwest, coming from Sande and Åpta in the Herad area. The large lake Framvaren flows into the Helvikfjorden, which joins the Lyngdalsfjorden from the west.

See also
 List of Norwegian fjords

References

Fjords of Agder
Farsund
Lyngdal